Since the 18th century, there have been several editions of the Book of Common Prayer produced and revised for use by Unitarians. All versions descend from an unpublished manuscript of alterations to the Church of England's 1662 Book of Common Prayer originally produced by Samuel Clarke in 1724.  Theophilus Lindsey of Essex Street Chapel in London and James Freeman of King's Chapel in Boston edited the liturgies further to produce their own prayer books that matched their theologies. These Unitarian forms influenced other prayer book revision efforts, including John Wesley's The Sunday Service of the Methodists and the compilation of the first prayer book for the Episcopal Church in the United States. The King's Chapel prayer book, currently in its ninth edition first published in 1986, continues to see use by the chapel's congregation.

History

Samuel Clarke, the Church of England rector of St James's Church, Piccadilly, privately created an altered version of the church's legally mandated liturgy, the 1662 Book of Common Prayer, in 1724. He was a Semi-Arian and, like early Unitarians in Transylvania and Poland, a subordinationist who held that God the Father was supreme and, unlike God the Son, alone worthy of worship. Clarke had previously written a study of 1,250 Bible verses, The Scriptural Doctrine of the Trinity, which contained his theology and prescribed a new rule for prayer based on the notion Jesus Christ derives his powers as savior from the Father. According to Clarke, the theology of the Trinity had developed as a result of poor metaphysics and the inclusion of the Athanasian Creed in the 1662 prayer book perpetuated this inaccurate theology.

In his 1724 manuscript of alterations to the 1662 prayer book, Clarke rewrote prayers to redirect them exclusively towards God the Father. Clarke was a friend of Queen Caroline, wife of King George II. After Caroline became queen in 1727, Clarke intended to request she push his nomination as a bishop, a position that would allow him to formally revise the prayer book. Had he not declined to sign the Thirty-nine Articles and encountered protests from then-Archbishop of Canterbury William Wake over this heterodoxy, historian A. Elliot Peaston believed Clarke might have become the Archbishop of Canterbury. Unable to secure official support for his views, Clarke's altered prayer book went unpublished. However, copies were made and the original manuscript alterations were given to the British Library following his death. 

Clarke's alterations would eventually inspire several revised prayers books for Presbyterian-influenced congregations and become the basis for what historian G. J. Cuming deemed the most influential unofficial revision to the 1662 prayer book. Theophilus Lindsey, then a Presbyterian-minded Church of England vicar at the Church of St Anne, Catterick, acquired a copy of Clarke's altered prayer book from his brother-in-law John Disney. Therein, Lindsey found Clarke's many revisions, including references to the Trinity "slashed out with violent strokes". Lindsey was so impressed with Clarke's work that he intended to introduce the changes to his congregation at Catterick but ultimately decided against such action as he believed they would in violation of his vows to the Church of England. However, following his resignation from the church and influenced by John Jones's 1749 Free and Candid Disquisitions, he added further Unitarian alterations to Clarke's work and published them in 1774 as The Book of Common Prayer reformed according to the plan of the late Dr Samuel Clarke, publishing an enlarged edition in 1775. While Lindsey used Clarke's name, liturgist Ronald Jasper argued that little was borrowed from the 1724 alterations in producing the 1774 prayer book and that Lindsey's liturgy was more radical, with influence from William Whiston.

Lindsey's prayer book was utilized by the Dissenter congregation he founded at Essex Street Chapel—the first formally Unitarian church in England—from its first service on 17 April 1774 onward. Lindsey was part of a network of like-minded churchmen, including Joseph Priestley, that had influenced Lindsey's aversion to the unmodified 1662 prayer book before his resignation from the Church of England. While Lindsey seems to have approved of Priestley's efforts to produce a paraphrased Bible, Lindsey retained the King James Version and 1662 prayer book's psalter for his revised prayer book on the premise that he was preserving the 1662 prayer book's scriptural foundations while replacing its theology. Lindsey's prayer book, which was repeatedly revised, proved popular with Presbyterians and helped cement the address of all prayers to God the Father as "one of the most tenacious characteristics of Unitarian worship."

Freeman and the King's Chapel liturgy

In 1784, Essex Street Chapel congregant William Hazlitt provided a copy of Lindsey's prayer book to his friend James Freeman of King's Chapel in Boston, spurring a Unitarian revision of the prayer book that remains in use there today. Founded by royal decree in 1686, King's Chapel was the oldest Anglican church in Boston and had spawned two other congregations, Old North Church in 1723 and Trinity Church in 1734. As the American Revolution War escalated, King's Chapel's Loyalist Anglican minister and much of its congregation fled with the British Army when it evacuated Boston in 1776. Those Anglicans who remained permitted members of the Old South Church congregation to use King's Chapel, with the two groups celebrating separately at alternating times in the day. Under this scheme Freeman, a Harvard graduate and Congregationalist, was invited to serve as a lay reader at King's Chapel in 1782. After the expiration of this six-month invitation, the congregation's proprietors chose Freeman as pastor on 21 April 1783.

Freeman was initially content using the 1662 prayer book as modified at Trinity Church. In the aftermath of the American Revolution, there was broad support for both a new American Anglican church and a local revision to the 1662 prayer book. Simultaneously, there was a rise of Unitarian sentiment across New England congregations, including at King's Chapel. Already, King's Chapel had ceased praying the 1662 prayer book's prescribed prayer for the king and royal family, instead substituting prayers for the president and Congress. Additionally, Freeman's position enabled him to say the Athanasian Creed at his discretion. Hazlitt, who had arrived in Boston from England in search of a preaching position, informed Freeman of Lindsey's prayer book and convinced Freeman and "several respectable ministers" to abandon the ubiquitous Trinitarian doxology.

At age 24, Freeman agitated for a revised prayer book for King's Chapel. On 20 February 1785, the proprietors voted to create a committee composed of seven men to report on Freeman's alterations. Drawing upon Clarke and Lindsey's work, Freeman worked with Hazlitt on a prayer book which was then put to a vote by the proprietor's of King's Chapel. Freeman wrote to his father before the vote, saying that, despite being optimistic that he had the necessary support, he would resign his position as pastor should the prayer book vote fail. On 19 June, Freeman's prayer book was adopted by a 20–7 majority. "Thus," Francis William Pitt Greenwood said in his sermon at Freeman's funeral, "the first Episcopal church in New England became the first Unitarian church in the New World."

The 1785 prayer book's preface held that "no Christian, it is supposed, can take offence at, or find his conscience wounded" by the King's Chapel liturgy and that "The Trinitarian, the Unitarian, the Calvinist, and the Arminian will read nothing in it which can give him any reasonable umbrage." Despite this, there was dissent and controversy over the liturgy's publication. With Freeman still not ordained, the congregation ruled out ordination within the Church of England in part due to its requirement ministers swear loyalty to the king. A Presbyterian ordination was rejected as the congregation wished to remain episcopal. Freeman thus applied for ordination in the new Anglican Episcopal Church in 1786. This application was rejected by Bishops Samuel Seabury and Samuel Provoost after Freeman refused to assent to the Episcopalians' own prayer book and the Trinitarian theology within it.

The congregation decided to ordain Freeman themselves, devising and performing their own "solemn and appropriate form" in November 1787, with the senior churchwarden laying his hands on Freeman. This event ended King's Chapel's association with the Episcopal Church. Samuel J. May wrote that Freeman was isolated during his early ministry through his exclusion from the Episcopal Church and poor integration with nearby Congregationalist ministers who were "embarrassed" by Freeman's use of a prayer book and liturgies. However, May recalled that Freeman enjoyed a "cordial friendship" with Joseph Eckley, the minister of Old South Meeting House. Freeman retired from ministry in 1826.

Under the guidance of assistant minister Samuel Cary, a second edition of the liturgy was published in 1811 which included services from other congregations and reintroduced prayers removed in the 1785 edition. Greenwood oversaw three revisions between 1828 and 1841 which sought to improve the prayer book's private devotional functionality and introduced over 100 hymns to the psalter. Theses additions were subsequently removed in the 1918 sixth edition by senior minister Howard N. Brown. This version would remain largely unchanged through 1980, though minister Joseph Barth introduced services from 1955 to 1965 which were likely influenced by his Catholic upbringing. The congregation also borrowed liturgical concepts from the Catholic Church's Second Vatican Council reforms.

In 1980, the vestry voted to create a committee of nine lay members to revise a new prayer book. This revision process took five years, culminating in the currently-used ninth edition in 1986. The congregation is now part of the Unitarian Universalist Association. King's Chapel is described as "Unitarian in theology, Anglican in worship, and congregational in governance," and its prayer book stands in contrast with the preference for humanist and non-Christian inspired forms of radical free worship among modern Unitarians.

Contents

Clarke

Clarke's 1724 manuscript of alterations to the 1662 prayer book were generally Unitarian and Nontrinitarian, with all Trinitarian formulae modified or removed. Clarke made these alterations with a pen within his personal copy of the prayer book. The alterations including deleting the Gloria Patri and replacing it with his own doxology that only addressed God the Father. He also rewrote portions of the Litany to direct prayers away from the Holy Spirit towards the Father. The Nicene Creed was replaced with a psalm; the Athanasian Creed was removed.

Clarke's ordinal deleted Trinitarian references at the conclusion of prayers and the formulae for the imposition of hands in the ordinations for priests and bishops were made prayers. The hymn "Come Holy Ghost" in the ordination of priests was supplanted with a psalm, while the wording in the consecratory rite for the episcopate of "fall to Prayer" was made "offer up our Prayers."

Lindsey
Lindsey's 1774 prayer book, which incorporated both his own and Clarke's alterations to the 1662 prayer book, was tonally Unitarian with some Puritan influence. In order to prevent the interpretation that a priest could forgive sins, the absolution at both Mattins and Evensong are both replaced with the Collect for Purity and the Communion office is rewritten as a prayer for God's forgiveness. The Te Deum, Benedicite, Magnificat and Nunc Dimittis were all removed. Additionally, the prefaces, Athanasian Creed, catechism, ordinal, and some collects were removed. The virgin birth of Jesus was rejected as "unhistorical" and Satan no longer mentioned within the Litany.

Lindsey's prayer book emphasized the Daily Office, drawing upon medieval Catholic practices and establishing non-Eucharistic offices as the norm for Unitarian worship. The Communion office—sans the Prayer of Humble Access, Lord's Prayer, and Prayer of Thanksgiving—was always led by Mattins. Lindsey similarly removed references to sacrifice and the Second Coming. Offices for private Baptism, the Baptism of those of Riper Years, and Confirmation were removed and the matrimonial office altered to included a longer exhortation.

While Lindsey's omissions were extensive, they were not entirely unusual among contemporary prayer book abridgments. It was not uncommon for 18th-century English printers trying to keep expenses down to delete material not conducive to devotional usage. Additionally, some of the material removed in the original 1774 revised prayer book were reintroduced in Lindsey's later edition, including within the 1791 edition that brought back offices for adult Baptism and ordination as well as a catechism.

King's Chapel
The first edition of the King's Chapel liturgy closely followed the amendments within Clarke's prayer book. Freeman's 1785 preface acknowledges that "great assistance hath been derived from the Judicious corrections of the Reverend Mr. Lindsey" and his prayer book revised according to "the truly pious and justly celebrated Doctor Samuel Clarke." The Trinitarian Gloria Patri was deleted, as were the Nicene and Athanasian Creeds. Freeman's low churchmanship and the congregation's egalitarianism saw "minister" replace "priest" and "ordinance" replace "sacrament". A catechism written by Priestley, who relocated to preach in Pennsylvania towards to end of his life, was included for teaching children.

Unlike Lindsey's prayer book, the King's Chapel prayer book retained the Benedicite due to its biblical basis in 2 Corinthians. The text also differed in keeping an altered Te Deum, as well as maintaining both the Venite and the General Confession's "there is no health in us." Freeman, writing to Lindsey in 1786, described that "Some defects and improprieties" were retained so that the King's Chapel congregation might "omit the most objectionable parts of the old service, the Athanasian prayers." According to King Chapel minister Carl Scovel, Freeman's 1785 liturgy appears "quite traditional" to the modern eye, with the Sunday offices and lectionary largely similar to those of the 1662 prayer book.

Greenwood reported that the first edition of the King's Chapel liturgy was immediately published after its approval and used until 1811, when it was supplanted with the amended second edition. Greenwood, replacing Freeman as pastor, guided the next three revisions; the 1828 third edition added further changes that were themselves unchanged in the 1831 fourth edition, the latter of which added family services, prayers, and devotional hymns. Greenwood also helmed a fifth edition in 1841. Over the course of his revisions, Greenwood introduced over 100 hymns to the psalter including those by Isaac Watts and Charles and John Wesley. 

In the 1918 sixth edition, Brown removed almost all of Greenwood's additions. In the same edition, Brown introduced the Didache—a previously lost early Christian text rediscovered in 1900–to the prayer book, though Scovel believed this addition was never used during King's Chapel services. The 1925 seventh edition differed very little from the sixth, with minor alterations to language within the Communion service. Though not formally published, an "eighth edition" developed between 1955 and 1965 under minister Joseph Barth through the introduction of additional services such as the imposition of ashes on Ash Wednesday. Barth and his services were likely influenced by his Catholic upbringing.

The latter forms remained in use through 1980, by which time the minister utilized the Common Lectionary. This lectionary would be formally integrated into the 1986 ninth edition, as would Evensong and several accreted services including midweek prayers. The entire psalter according to the King James Version with minor Revised Standard Version-based changes and more than thirty hymns were also included in this revision. Most of the 1662 prayer book's language was retained, but the revising committee made "modest changes" to remove male generic terms.

Influence

While few ministers followed Lindsey in resigning from the Church of England, many shared his theology and considered his 1774 prayer book a modernization of the 1662 liturgy. Through the 19th century, new editions of Lindsey's prayer book and derivatives were printed, with the Athanasian Creed remaining their primary objection. With Lindsey's prayer book as inspiration, 15 liturgies based on the 1662 prayer book were published in England between 1792 and 1854 with similar Unitarian "modernizations". Peaston assessed these liturgies as "remarkable for the rationality of their thought, and the tediousness of their expression. They would seem indeed to have been in the tradition of John Locke."

John Wesley created his own revision of the 1662 prayer book in 1784 for American Methodists entitled The Sunday Service of the Methodists in North America. Wesley, who considered the 1662 prayer book strong in its "solid, scriptural, rational Piety", is known to have been interested in producing a revised prayer book since 1736. Clarke, Lindsey, Jones, and Whiston are among the prayer book revisionists that Wesley explicitly named in his personal writings and Wesley was familiar with Lindsey through the Feathers Tavern Association. While Wesley never said whether he read Lindsey's prayer book, the 1784 Sunday Service contained many parallels with the 1774 revision, including omitting a confirmation rite.

After approving the 1785 liturgy, members of King's Chapel held a measure of expectation that other American Anglican congregations would follow their lead in issuing their own revised prayer books. So that the new Episcopal Church might have its own prayer book, its General Convention authorized a committee with broad powers. The Unitarians of King's Chapel hoped that the new prayer book would match their theology. William Smith of Maryland was the committee's most important member, with the similarly important William White also serving on the committee. The adoption of Freeman's liturgy at King Chapel spurred White to correspond with a Charles Miller. Here, White acknowledged the King's Chapel congregation's actions as irregular and defended Trinitarian orthodoxy but also admitted his own desires that the Episcopal Church's revised prayer book remove non-scriptural doctrines and creeds. The committee published their proposed prayer book on 1 April 1786. The text reflected English Deist influence and anticipated the "great outbreak of American Unitarianism" that came in 1815. This proposed prayer book removed the Nicene and Athanasian Creeds, omitted the "He descended into hell" from the Apostles' Creed, and reduced praise to the Trinity. This text did not last and a more conservative prayer book revision was approved by the General Convention in 1789 and introduced in 1790.

Unitarian and Prime Minister of the United Kingdom Neville Chamberlain utilized the phrase "Peace for our time", a modified form of the phrase "peace in our time" which appears in the 1662 prayer book. It is possible that his familiarity with the phrase came from its retention within Lindsey's recension of the Book of Common Prayer and modified appearance within later Unitarian service books.

See also

Book of Common Prayer
Doctrine of the Trinity Act 1813
Great Ejection
Savoy Conference

Notes

References

Further reading
Lindsey's revision of Clarke's prayer book, 1774
Fifth edition of Lindsey's prayer book, 1805
First edition of the King's Chapel Liturgy and Psalter, 1785
Foote, Henry Wilder; Clarke, James Freeman (1885). The Centenary of the King's Chapel Liturgy. Boston: Press of George H. Ellis.

1724 books
1774 books
1785 books
1986 books
1774 in Christianity
1785 in Christianity
1986 in Christianity
1774 in England
1785 in Massachusetts
Book of Common Prayer
Christianity in Boston
English Dissenters
Episcopal Church in Massachusetts
Unitarianism